Barry Jackson may refer to:

Sports
Barry Jackson (athlete) (born 1941), track and field athlete
Barry Jackson (cricketer) (born 1966), English cricketer
Barry Jackson (footballer) (1938–2021), English footballer
Barry Jackson (rugby union) (1937–2019), England international rugby union player

Other
Barry Jackson (actor) (1938–2013), English actor
Barry Jackson (director) (1879–1961), English theatre director
Barry E. Jackson (born 1954), production designer and writer
Barry Steven Jackson (born 1960), Congressional staffer
Barry Jackson (surgeon) (born 1936), British surgeon